Consenting Guinea Pig is the EP by T.H.C., released on November 26, 1996 by Full Contact Records.

Reception
In their review of Consenting Guinea Pig, Aiding & Abetting compared the band favorably to Ob1 and Virtualizer, commended the band's blend of EDM with trip hop and stated that "not many folks do this stuff better." A critic at Sonic Boom was negative in his review towards the album, calling it "a derivative project" and "nothing more than a minimalistic collection of rather bland bass and percussion."

Track listing

Personnel 
Adapted from the Consenting Guinea Pig liner notes.

T.H.C.
 George Sarah – instruments, producer, recording (1, 2)

Additional performers
 Sarah Folkman – vocals (3)
 Thomas Franzmann (as Zip Campisi) – remixer (6)

Production and design
 Zalman Fishman – executive-producer
 Wrex Mock – mastering
 Timothy Wiles (as Q) – recording (1, 4, 5), engineering (3), additional programming (4, 5),

Release history

References

External links 
 Consenting Guinea Pig at Discogs (list of releases)

1996 EPs
T.H.C. (band) albums
Full Contact Records EPs